McKinley Boston Jr. (born November 5, 1945) is an American university administrator who most recently was athletic director at New Mexico State University. He was named athletics director on December 14, 2004 and retired effective December 31, 2014.

Boston is from Elizabeth City, North Carolina and graduated from P. W.  Moore High School in 1964. He attended the University of Minnesota from 1964 to 1968 where he played football. Boston went on to play professionally for the New York Giants in the National Football League (NFL) and for the BC Lions in the Canadian Football League (CFL) for two years.

Boston received his bachelor's degree in 1973 and his master's degree in 1974 from Montclair State University.  He received his doctorate in education in 1987 from New York University.

Boston served as director of athletics at Kean College in Union, New Jersey (1986–1987) and University of Rhode Island (1989–1991).

Boston was named the AD at the University of Minnesota in 1991 and in 1995 he became vice president for student development and athletics at Minnesota. He left the University of Minnesota in 1999, along with then-men's athletic director Mark Dienhart, in connection with the release by the University of a report on an academic cheating scandal involving the men's basketball program.

References

External links
 

1945 births
Living people
American football defensive ends
American football linebackers
American players of Canadian football
BC Lions players
Kean Cougars athletic directors
Montclair State Red Hawks football coaches
Minnesota Golden Gophers athletic directors
Minnesota Golden Gophers football players
New Mexico State Aggies athletic directors
New York Giants players
Rhode Island Rams athletic directors
Montclair State University alumni
New York University alumni
People from Elizabeth City, North Carolina
Players of American football from North Carolina